Eric Butorac and Jean-Julien Rojer were the defending champions but decided not to participate together.
Butorac plays alongside Bruno Soares, while Rojer partners up with Aisam-ul-Haq Qureshi.
Aisam-ul-Haq Qureshi and Jean-Julien Rojer won the title defeating Julian Knowle and David Marrero 7–5, 7–5 in the final.

Seeds

Draw

Draw

References
 Main Draw

Estoril Open - Doubles
Portugal Open
Estoril Open